The Crowell Buttresses are a series of high snow and rock buttresses,  long, forming the north wall of Cornwall Glacier for a distance of  and then trending northeast an equal distance along the west side of Lowery Glacier, in the Queen Elizabeth Range. The feature was named by the Advisory Committee on Antarctic Names after John T. Crowell (died 1986), who served with the National Science Foundation as Antarctic Vessel Project Officer, 1960–63, and Special Projects Officer, 1963–69. He led a reconnaissance party to the Antarctic Peninsula in January 1963 to investigate the location for a U.S. station in the peninsula area.

References 

Rock formations of the Ross Dependency
Shackleton Coast